José Freitas Martins (born 19 September 1951) is a Portuguese former racing cyclist. He rode in four editions of the Tour de France and five editions of the Vuelta a España.

Major results

1972
 2nd Overall Volta a Portugal
1973
 3rd Overall Volta a Portugal
1974
 3rd Overall Vuelta a Asturias
 4th Overall Vuelta a Mallorca
1st Prologue
 5th Overall Volta a Catalunya
1975
 1st Overall Vuelta a los Valles Mineros
 2nd Overall Vuelta a Aragón
 2nd Klasika Primavera
 3rd Overall Volta a Catalunya
 3rd Road race, National Road Championships
 3rd Overall Escalada a Montjuïc
 5th Overall Tour of the Basque Country
 7th Overall Vuelta a la Comunidad Valenciana
 8th Overall Vuelta a España
 10th Overall Setmana Catalana de Ciclisme
1976
 4th Overall Tour de Suisse
 7th Overall Setmana Catalana de Ciclisme
1977
 1st Clásica de Sabiñánigo
 9th GP Villafranca de Ordizia
 10th Overall Vuelta a Andalucía
1978
 1st Stage 2a (TTT) Vuelta a Cantabria
 9th GP Villafranca de Ordizia
1980
 1st Stage 11 Volta a Portugal

References

External links
 

1951 births
Living people
Portuguese male cyclists
People from Fafe
Sportspeople from Braga District